Theart and Another v Minnaar NO; Senekal v Winskor 174 (Pty) Ltd is an important case in South African property law and civil procedure, as well as in the area of legal interpretation. It was heard in the Supreme Court of Appeal on November 5, 2009, with judgment handed down on December 3. Mpati P, Brand JA, Snyders JA, Malan JA and Bosielo JA presided. Counsel for the appellants was BC Wharton; CHJ Maree appeared for the respondent in case No. 483/08 and M. Verster for the respondent in case No. 007/09. These were appeals from two decisions in the High Court, Cape Town. The appellants' attorneys were RP Totos, Cape Town, and Symington & De Kok, Bloemfontein. The respondent's attorneys in case No. 483/08 were Van der Spuy & Vennote, Cape Town, and Phatshoane Henney Ing, Bloemfontein. The respondent's attorneys in case No. 007/09 were JC Van der Berg Attorneys, George, and Hill, McHardy & Herbst Ing, Bloemfontein.

In two cases of unlawful occupation of land, and actions for statutory eviction from such land, the notice requirements of the Magistrates' Courts came under scrutiny. The Magistrates' Courts Rules compel a procedure differing from that in the High Court. Bosielo JA, however, found that, as long as the notice achieves the general purpose contemplated by the Prevention of Illegal Eviction from and Unlawful Occupation of Land Act (PIE) and the Magistrates' Courts Rules, the fact that the notice does not strictly comply with such provisions is not necessarily fatal; in other words, two notices in two separate documents were not required.

Facts 
In the High Court, eviction procedure under PIE is determined by section 4 of that legislation, as well as by the Uniform Rules of the High Court. The combined effect of these statutory provisions is explained in Cape Killarney Property Investments v Mahamba.

The procedure in the Magistrates' Courts is different from that in the High Court, because of the difference in the provisions of Rule 55 of the Magistrates' Courts Rules, on the one hand, from those of Rule 6 of the Uniform Rules of the High Court, on the other.

In the Magistrates' Court, two notices contained in two separate documents are not required. One will suffice as long as

 the content of the document and the manner of service are approved by the Magistrates' Court with jurisdiction, as envisaged by section 4(2) of PIE, pursuant to a preceding ex parte application;
 the contents of the document comply with the provisions of section 4(5) of PIE, with Rule 55 of the Magistrates' Courts Rules and the court order under (1); and
 the document is served on the respondent and the municipality concerned in accordance with section 4(2) of PIE, the Magistrates' Courts Rules pertaining to service and the court order under (1).

Judgment 
When considering the order to be granted in terms the procedure above, held Bosielo JA (Mpati P, Brand JA, Snyders JA and Malan JA concurring), the court is obliged to ensure that the notice will be "effective" in the circumstances of the case, having regard to the intent and import of PIE and section 26(3) of the Constitution.

The fact that the notice served on the respondent is in some respect deficient of section 4(2) or Rule 55 (as it was in both cases here) will not necessarily be fatal if the notice achieved the purpose contemplated by these statutory provisions. Whether that purpose had been achieved cannot be considered in the abstract, but will depend on the facts of each case.

See also 
 Legal interpretation in South Africa
 South African civil procedure
 South African property law

References

Books 
 Juta's Statutes of South Africa 2008/9 vol 6.

Cases 
 Cape Killarney Property Investments (Pty) Ltd v Mahamba and Others 2001 (4) SA 1222 (SCA).
 Moela v Shoniwe 2005 (4) SA 357 (SCA).
 Theart and Another v Minnaar NO 2009 (3) SA 503 (C).
 Unlawful Occupiers, School Site v City of Johannesburg 2005 (4) SA 199 (SCA).

Statutes, etc. 
 Magistrates' Courts Rules.
 Prevention of Illegal Eviction from and Unlawful Occupation of Land Act 19 of 1998.

Notes 

Supreme Court of Appeal of South Africa cases
2009 in South African law
2009 in case law